Ulf Kvendbo (born 11 April 1948 in Stockholm, Sweden) is a Canadian former ski jumper who competed in the 1968 Winter Olympics and in the 1972 Winter Olympics.

References

1948 births
Living people
Canadian male ski jumpers
Olympic ski jumpers of Canada
Ski jumpers at the 1968 Winter Olympics
Ski jumpers at the 1972 Winter Olympics